Roman Aleksandrovich Slavnov (born 28 April 1982) is a former Russian professional footballer.

Club career
He made his debut in the Russian Premier League in 2003 for FC Torpedo-Metallurg Moscow.

References

1982 births
Footballers from Moscow
Living people
Russian footballers
FC Moscow players
FC Shinnik Yaroslavl players
FC KAMAZ Naberezhnye Chelny players
FC Salyut Belgorod players
Russian Premier League players
FC Luch Vladivostok players
FC Sodovik Sterlitamak players
FC SKA-Khabarovsk players
FC Baltika Kaliningrad players
Association football midfielders